Henry Deacon (25 December 1809 – 18 August 1854) was an English first-class cricketer and umpire.

Deacon was born at Leicester in December 1809. He made his debut in first-class cricket for the North against the Marylebone Cricket Club at Lord's in 1840. He made four further first-class appearances for the North, with his final appearance coming in 1842. Playing as a bowler, he took 24 wickets in his five first-class matches, taking five wickets in an innings on two occasions. He scored 32 with the bat, with a high score of 9. In addition to playing first-class cricket, he also played in minor matches for Leicester and Warwickshire. He stood once as an umpire in a first-class match between Nottinghamshire and Kent in 1841. Deacon died at Leicester in August 1854.

References

External links

1809 births
1854 deaths
Cricketers from Leicester
English cricketers
North v South cricketers
English cricket umpires